Demolition Pumpkin Squeeze Musik is a mixtape by DJ Q-bert.  It was released in 1994, one year before he invented the "crab scratch."  The samples on this album come from bands (including Rush), cartoons (Racketeer Rabbit, Ren & Stimpy, The Huckleberry Hound Show), comic books (including Spider-Man), video games (including Street Fighter II), and movies (including The Warriors and Style Wars). The mix also contains many classic examples of hip hop break (music) with heavy scratching over top.

The Breaks

External links
 The world keeps turning, Fairfax Digital
 2010 Interview with Qbert about the mix, Super B-Beat show (2010)

Mixtape albums
1994 albums